Dodges Ferry is a rural / residential locality in the local government area (LGA) of Sorell in the South-east LGA region of Tasmania. The 2016 census recorded a population of 2467 for the state suburb of Dodges Ferry.

History 
Dodges Ferry was gazetted as a locality in 1966.

Located on the eastern side of the entrance to Pittwater estuary it was named after Ralph Dodge (1791-1871) who operated a ferry service across Pittwater from the 1820s.

Dodges Ferry has long been a popular holiday area for Tasmanians with a focus on water activities. With its reputation for beautiful beaches (Frederick Henry Bay,Tiger Head Beach, Red Ochre Beach, Carlton Beach, Okines Beach), safe swimming areas, fishing, boating and a popular surf beach Park beach, people flock to the area on warmer days.

Since the 1960s Dodges Ferry has had a steady influx of permanent residents, changing from a holiday shack town to a residential town with newer facilities.  At the 2016 census, Dodges Ferry had a population of 2,467.

Geography
The waters of Frederick Henry Bay form the western to southern boundaries.

Road infrastructure
Route C334 (Old Forcett Road / Carlton River Road) runs through from north-west to east.

Gallery

See also 

Dodges Ferry Football Club
Sorell Council

References

External links

Towns in Tasmania
Localities of Sorell Council